The Porsche 987 is the internal designation for the second generation Porsche Boxster sports car. It made its debut at the 2004 Paris Motor Show alongside the 911 (997) and went on sale in 2005.

In 2005, it was joined in the range by the new Cayman fastback coupé (project 987c) with which it shared the same mid-engine platform and many components, including the front fenders and trunk lid, doors, headlights, taillights, and forward portion of the interior.

It was replaced by the Porsche 981 in 2012.

Boxster 987.1

The 987 was the second generation Boxster model, but remained very similar to the previous generation. The most obvious styling change is to the headlights, which now have a profile similar to those of the Carrera GT, Porsche's flagship mid-engine sports car of the time. The intake vents on the sides of the Boxster were now larger, with more pronounced horizontal slats and are coloured metallic silver, irrespective of the paint colour on the rest of the car. The wheel arches were enlarged to allow wheels up to 19 inches in diameter, a first for the Boxster series.

The most significant updates from the 986 series are in the interior, with a more prominent circular theme evident in the instrument cluster and cooling vents. Porsche claims that the 987 Boxster shares only 20% of its components with its predecessor. The base engine is a 2.7-litre  flat-6, with the Boxster S getting a 3.2-litre  engine. The Cayman 2-door fastback coupé is derived from the 987.

For the 2007 model year, the base Boxster received a revised engine featuring VarioCam Plus to provide a  power increase ( the same as the Cayman). The Boxster S' engine was upgraded from 3.2-litre to 3.4-litre, resulting in a power increase of  more ( the same as the Cayman S). These upgrades made the Boxster series and the Cayman series equivalent in terms of power.

Boxster 987.1 Specifications

Boxster 987.2 

Porsche first revealed the new revised 987.2 2008 Boxster and Boxster S models at the Los Angeles International Auto Show in November 2008, using totally new engines (MA1.20/MA1.21). Both models featured greater power due to an increase in engine displacement for the Boxster and the incorporation of Direct Fuel Injection (DFI) for the Boxster S. Both models were available with Porsche's new 7-speed Porsche Doppelkupplungsgetriebe (PDK) dual clutch gearbox but came standard with a new 6-speed manual gearbox. Cosmetic changes to the 2009 Boxster and Boxster S included new head and tail lights, larger front air intakes with incorporated daytime running lights, and an altered lower rear end flanked by twin diffusers. The interior included the redesigned Porsche Communication Management System as an option with a touchscreen interface to reduce button clutter.

Boxster 987.2 Specifications

Special models

RS60 Spyder 

In November 2007, Porsche announced a commemorative RS60 Spyder edition of the Boxster to celebrate Porsche's 1960 win in the 12 Hours of Sebring in Florida. Only 1,960 units were produced worldwide, with approximately 800 slated for the U.S. with each model bearing a numbered production badge on the dash. The RS60 Spyder came only in GT Silver Metallic exterior colour while the standard interior is Carrera Red leather, with dark gray leather as an option.

The limited production Boxster S Porsche Design Edition 2 debuted in October 2008 as 2009 model. It came in a unified Carrera White paint scheme with matching white 19-inch wheels, a black and grey interior with white gauges, red taillights and light grey stripes along the entire body. 500 were made for the worldwide market, 32 shipped into the U.S. and 18 into Canada.

Porsche unveiled its 2008 Limited Edition Boxster and Boxster S models at a private gathering at the occasion of the 2007 New York Auto Show. Largely inspired by the 2007 911 GT3 RS, only 250 examples of each model were produced in brilliant orange. Other special exterior features included glossy black painted mirrors, alloy wheels, front and side air inlets, and model designation. The SportDesign package was included as standard which includes aggressive front splitters, a revised rear two-stage spoiler that extends automatically at speed, and an integrated rear diffuser. A sports exhaust system with a dual chromed exhaust tip completed the exterior modifications. On the interior, a numbered 'Limited Edition' plaque is found on the glove box door, while the seat inserts, 911 GT3-spec steering wheel, and handbrake lever all receive Alcantara trim, a suede-like material. Orange roll-over hoops, door lever surrounds, shift knob, cup-holder cover trim and even the font on the gear shift pattern carrying bright orange that match the exterior colour and offset the otherwise black interior.

Boxster Spyder 

On 5 November 2009, Porsche officially announced a new variant of the Boxster, which was officially unveiled at the 2009 Los Angeles Motor Show. Positioned above the Boxster S, the Boxster Spyder was the lightest Porsche on the market at the time, weighing ,  lighter than a Boxster S. This was achieved through the elimination of the conventional soft top's operating mechanism, the radio/PCM unit, door handles, air conditioning, storage compartments, cup holders and large LED light modules on the front fascia, although some of these could be re-added to the car in the form of options. Weight saving was also gained using aluminum doors, an aluminum rear deck and the lightest 19-inch wheels in the Porsche pallet. The Spyder has a firmer suspension setup than the other Boxster models, and is almost one inch lower in order to have improved handling. A manually operated canvas top, carbon fibre sports bucket seats and two signature humps running along the back of the vehicle provide characteristic design elements. The vehicle was released worldwide in February 2010 as a 2011 model.

Boxster E 

The 987 chassis was used to develop three battery-electric prototypes in 2011, each known as the Boxster E, as part of the "Model Region Electro-Mobility Stuttgart" practical trial. One prototype was equipped with electric traction motors for both the front and rear axles, while the other two were equipped with motors on the rear axle only. The Boxster E prototypes were unveiled at the Michelin Challenge Bibendum in May 2011.

Cayman 987.1

After two years of development, the first model of the fastback coupé to be released was the Cayman S (type 987120). Photographs and technical details were released in May 2005, but the public unveiling took place at the September Frankfurt Motor Show. The S suffix (for Sport or Special) indicated that this was a higher performance version of a then unreleased base model. That model, the Cayman (987110), went on sale in July 2006.

The Cayman fastback coupé (project 987c) and the second generation Boxster roadster (project 987) shared the same mid-engine platform and many components, including the front fenders and trunk lid, doors, headlights, taillights, and forward portion of the interior. The design of the Cayman's body incorporates styling cues from classic Porsches; 356/1, the 550 Coupé and the 904 Coupé.
The 987.1 Cayman used the M97.20 and M97.21 engines.

Unlike the Boxster, the Cayman has a hatchback for access to luggage areas on top of and in the back of the engine cover. The entire rear section rear-wards of the side doors of the Cayman is made from stainless steel. The suspension design is fundamentally the same as that of the Boxster with revised settings due to the stiffer chassis with the car's fixed roof.

The 3.4-litre flat-6 boxer engine (M97.21) in the first generation Cayman S was derived from the 3.2-litre (M96.26) that was used in the Boxster S, with cylinder heads from the 997 S's 3.8-litre engine (M97.01), which have the VarioCam Plus inlet valve timing and lift system. A less powerful but more fuel efficient version, the 2.7-litre M97.20, powered the base model. The use of these engines exclusively in Caymans ended in the 2007 model year when Porsche upgraded the Boxster (987310) and Boxster S (987320).

A 5-speed manual transaxle is standard on the Cayman (G87.01), while a 6-speed manual (Getrag 466) was the standard transmission for the S model (G87.21) and an option on the base model (A87.20). An electronically controlled 5-speed automatic transaxle (Tiptronic) was also available on the S (A87.21) and the non-S version (A87.02) (The 2009 models replaced this option with a seven-speed "PDK", Porsche's dual clutch transmission. Other options include active shock absorbers (ThyssenKrupp Bilstein GmbH's DampTronic, rebadged as PASM by Porsche), ceramic disc brakes (PCCB), xenon headlights (Hella's Bi-Xenon) and an electronically controlled sport mode (Sport Chrono Package).

The first generation Cayman ceased production in November 2011.

Cayman 987.1 Specifications 

Performance

The Cayman S' performances equalled the performance of Porsche's flagship models at the time. Rally racing driver Walter Röhrl lapped the Nürburgring Nordschleife track in a Cayman S equipped with optional 19" wheels, PCCB, and PASM in a time of 8 minutes, 11 seconds. The time for a standard Cayman S, as published by the manufacturer, was 8 minutes, 20 seconds. In contrast, Röhrl recorded 8 minutes, 15 seconds in a 911 Carrera.

A Cayman prepared and run by private team of Jürgen and Uwe Alzen finished fourth overall (of 220 entrants) in the 2007 Nürburgring 24 Hour race, ahead of two flagship Porsche 997 GT3 RSR's, a 997 GT3 Cup, and a 996 GT3 Cup. Another two privateer Caymans, entered by CSR and MSpeed, finished 22nd and 117th overall, respectively. Porsche disclaims support for the Cayman teams, while supporting some or all of the 997 teams.

Starting with the 2009 model, a limited slip differential was available as an option. The base Cayman received an engine upgrade to 2.9 L, and the Cayman S a 3.4 L. The factory tuned 2008 Cayman S Sport with its special exhaust system produces  from its 3.4 L engine.

Cayman 987.2 

A revised version of the Porsche Cayman 987 was introduced on 21 February 2009, with a totally new engine (MA1.20/MA1.21). The new engines no longer had the Intermediate Shaft, which proved to be a weak link in pre-2009 engines. Both the Cayman and Cayman S maintained a  power advantage over their roadster sibling, the Boxster. The design for the front bumper was also kept distinct for the two models. The front signal lamps are designed differently: while both use LED signal lamps, the Cayman's are arranged like the face of dice while the Boxster has a horizontal row of 4 LEDs. The Porsche Tiptronic S automatic gearbox was replaced by the 7-speed PDK dual clutch transmission for the new model. 
Also a limited slip differential is now a factory option.

Cayman 987.2 Specifications

Special Models

Design Edition 1 
The Porsche Design Edition 1 is a Cayman S model designed by Porsche Design, commemorating the 35th anniversary of Porsche Design. The all black car has a black leather interior on the seats, dashboard, and door trim, as well as black Alcantara steering wheel, gear lever, handbrake grip, and headliner. The Porsche Design Edition 1 also is fitted standard with the Porsche Active Suspension Management (PASM), 19-inch 911 (997) Turbo wheels with 235/35 ZR 19 front and 265/35 ZR 19 rear tyres, Porsche Design script on the instrument dials, stainless steel entry plate engraved with "Porsche Design Edition 1", all-red rear taillights, custom vinyl exterior black-on-black graphics, and a numbered plaque on the glovebox cover. Standard equipment includes a briefcase containing the Flat Six Chronograph, a pocket knife, a pair of sunglasses, a pen, and a key ring – all in black, even the knife blade. A total of 777 vehicles were produced as 2008 models. It went on sale in November 2007 in Germany, followed by the U.S. in January 2008.

Cayman S Sport 
Porsche also announced the production of a limited edition Cayman S Sport, which was available in October 2008 as a 2009 model. This version of the Cayman S includes PSE (Porsche Sports Exhaust), PASM (Porsche Active Suspension Management), and Sport Chrono.

The Cayman S Sport comes in Bright Orange and Signal Green (from the 911 GT3 RS), as well as Carrara White, Speed Yellow, Guards Red, Black, and Arctic Silver (done upon special order at an extra cost). The Cayman S Sport also features short shifter, sports seats, deviated color seatbelts, "Cayman S" striping on the door sides, black Porsche Design 19-inch wheels, various gloss black interior trims, gloss black side mirrors, stainless steel door sills with "Cayman S Sport" script, 5 mm wheel spacers, and Alcantara steering wheel and shift knob from the 997 911 GT3 RS. The instrumentation does not include a hood. The body is lowered by 1 cm due to its PASM feature. A total of 700 were made, with only 100 coming to the US.

Cayman R 

The Cayman R was introduced in 2011, and is based on the 2009 Cayman S. It features the Porsche OEM aerokit that was first introduced in 2007 as a factory option, 19 inch lightweight wheels shared with the Boxster Spyder, lighter aluminium doors from 997 911 GT3, lighter fiberglass bucket seats with carbon fibre backing from the 997 911 GT2, and with the removal of the radio, storage compartments, air-conditioning, and door handles, the Cayman R weighs in at  less than a Cayman S. The Cayman R also received various cosmetic changes similar to ones seen on the earlier Cayman S Sport, such as decals on the doors, instrument cover delete, gloss black painted mirrors, black model designation emblem on the trunk, as well as black painted wheels.

With the new passive sports suspensions, the Cayman R was  lower than a Cayman S equipped with PASM, or  lower than one equipped with standard passive suspension. The standard Cayman R can accelerate from 0– in 5 seconds, and with the optional 7-speed PDK dual clutch transmission and the Sport Chrono package, it can accelerate from 0– in 4.4 seconds. The Cayman R made its debut at the 2010 Los Angeles Auto Show on 17 November 2010 and only 1,621 were made.

Based on the Cayman R, Porsche also produced the Porsche Cayman S Black Edition with sales starting in July, 2011. The Black Edition is the rarest limited edition Cayman with only 500 built.

Deliveries 

&ast; Uncertain due to typos in press release or change in style of reports used.
Source:

References

987
Cars powered by boxer engines
Rear mid-engine, rear-wheel-drive vehicles
Sports cars
Coupés
Roadsters
Cars introduced in 2005
2010s cars